Akatta is a major town in Oru East Local Government Area of Imo State in Nigeria. It is bordered to the north west by the towns Nnempi, Akuma and Amagu, to the north east by Amaebu and Amazu, to the south east by Okporo, Umutanze and Atta Njaba, and to the south west by Omuma. The following villages make up Akatta: Akwa, Urah, Ichi-Amaka, Ubaha, Ubahangwu, Okporo, Okwu and Azu Akatta.

Akatta has produced at least two members of the Imo state house of Assembly, two permanent secretaries/principal secretaries, professors, among others.

Ethnicity 
The majority of the population are Igbo and have Igbo culture.

Religion
Christianity is the dominant religion in Akatta, with the majority of the population Catholics, followed by the Anglicans and other Protestants. There is a small minority of Jehovah Witness and other Christian denominations. There are three Roman Catholic parishes, which are all part of the Catholic Diocese of Orlu:
St. Michael's Catholic Parish Akatta
St. Martin's Catholic Parish Akwa Akatta
St. Patrick Catholic Parish Ihitte Akatta
Others:
Christ Anglican Church Okporo Akatta
Deeper Christian Life Ministry Akatta
Assemblies of God Church, Akwa Akatta

Education
Akatta has one public secondary school, over six public primary schools and a number of private schools. 
The public schools include:
Akatta Secondary School, Akatta
Akwa Primary School (also known as Central School Ihitte Akatta)
Urah Primary School
Ichi Primary School
Central School Akatta
Ubaha Primary School
Community Primary School Okporo Akatta
The private schools include:
 JJSS  commercial school Ubahangwu Akatta
 Fr.Justin International  Secondary School Uzii/Amankwo Akatta
 Obieze Commercial school  Urah Akatta

Notable people
Chief Vincent Onyenorah(Ide Akatta)
Sir Val Obieze
Barr Greg Okemmili
Engr Isaac KC Onwuzuruike
Dr Eugene Okolie HRH
Professor J.Obiukwu Duru (the first professor from Akatta)
Engr Cosmas Onyenorah (First Engineer from Akatta.
Sir Ben Igwe
 Andrew Arusiuka (Business Insurance)

Commerce
 Firstbank of Nigeria Plc Akatta Branch
 GreenField MicroFinance Bank

Markets
Afor Akatta (the major market in Akatta)
Nkwo Akwa (an evening mini-market)

Tourism
Okporo Monkey Forest Reserve
Ichi-Amaka Money colony reserve

Festival
The New Yam Festival
End of year Football Competition, amongst others.

References 

Towns in Imo State